This is a list of films which placed number-one at the weekend box office in Colombia during 2021. Amounts are in American dollars.

Highest-grossing films

References

2021 in Colombia
2021
Colombia